Ammonihah is a city mentioned in the Book of Mormon that is governed by a class of lawyers and judges who lead an aristocratic and materialistic social order. When the Book of Mormon prophet Alma visits Ammonihah as part of a ministerial tour, the city becomes the setting of "one of the most disturbing episodes" of the text in which Ammonihah's governing elite imprison him, exile any men converted by his preaching, and kill women and children associated with his mission by fire. 

The narrative set in Ammonihah is intertextual with the Old and New Testaments. Literary and theological scholarship treat the Ammonihah story as an exploration of suffering and a turning point in the Book of Mormon's use of the phrase "lake of fire and brimstone" as a metaphor for hell.  

Artist John Held Sr. was commissioned to depict Ammonihah in two woodblock prints for George Reynolds's 1888 The Story of the Book of Mormon. These were among the first published illustrations of Book of Mormon content.

Background

Book of Mormon 
The Book of Mormon is the primary religious text of the Latter Day Saint movement. In the book's narrative, a family flees Jerusalem in approximately 600 BCE, prophetically directed to escape the Babylonian captivity. Led by God, they arrive in the Americas and establish a society which, due to a deepening fraternal disputation, splits into two: the Nephites and the Lamanites. Despite preceding the advent of Jesus, the Nephites have a Christian society with prophets among them. The majority of the story is framed as the retrospective work of its principal narrator, Mormon, a Nephite who lives near the end of the chronological narrative and reflexively describes creating the text that is the Book of Mormon by abridging and quoting from Nephite history.

Book of Alma 
The Book of Mormon is further divided into fifteen internal books, named after prophets in the text in a manner reminiscent of the prophetic books of the Bible. The ninth book is the book of Alma, named after Alma, a prophet who is the son of the late founder of the then-current incarnation of the Nephite church. In this sub-book, Mormon narrates Alma's ministry and that of his son Helaman during the "reign of the judges", a period in which rule by judges has replaced monarchy in Nephite society.

The book of Alma structurally divides into four quarters that alternatively parallel each other. In the first and third quarters (Alma 1–16 and 30–44), Alma encounters dissent among Nephites and responds; in the second and fourth quarters (Alma 17–29 and 45–63), Mormon narrates Nephite–Lamanite interactions.

The majority of the Ammonihah narrative is framed by an inclusio spanning Alma 9–16.

Nephite dissenters and Alma 
Prior to the Ammonihah narrative, the Book of Mormon develops an ongoing plot depicting a series of dissident movements in Nephite society whose participants persecute members of the Nephite church and reject its orthodoxy on the need for a Redeemer. The first of these are called "unbelievers", and in Alma's first appearance he is an active and highly persuasive unbeliever who convinces "many of the people to do after the manner of his iniquities". Alma's life drastically changes when an angel appears and commands him to repent. In a reversal that is intertextual with the apostle Paul's story in the New Testament, Alma does repent, and his transformation is so complete he goes on to become high priest of the Nephite church.

In addition to being high priest of the church, Alma spends some time ruling as chief judge. The first case the narrative describes him overseeing is for a man named Nehor who, during a debate about religion, murders a Nephite church member. Nehor is also the founder of a new church whose teachings are similar to the ideas of the unbeliever movement Alma was part of. Despite the resemblance to his past self, Alma sentences Nehor to death for the murder.

Despite Nehor's death, his ideas gain popularity among Nephites, and the narrative describes Ammonihah as a community that accepts the teachings of Nehor.

Narrative

Ministry 
The Ammonihah narrative begins with Alma on a preaching tour throughout Nephite cities, having stepped down as chief judge in order to focus on spiritual ministry. Ammonihah, a community that has politically and religiously distanced itself from the rest of Nephite society, is the fourth city he visits. When Alma arrives the people abruptly refuse to give him an audience, and they aggressively mock him and "his" church. In response to this rejection, Alma leaves, but once he is outside the city, an angel directs him to return and preach repentance to Ammonihah. The angel warns Alma that Ammonihah is not only doctrinally heterodox but also plotting political sedition, as some "study at this time that they may destroy the liberty of thy people". 

When Alma reenters the city, he meets Amulek, who offers Alma food and a place to stay, which Alma accepts. Alma invokes a blessing on Amulek's home and family, and they commence preaching in Ammonihah as a duo.

An elite governing class of judges and lawyers, unique in the Book of Mormon to Ammonihah, confront Alma and Amulek. The lawyers and judges accuse the pair of trying to undermine Ammonihah's aristocratic and materialistic political order. Among these interlocutors are the lawyer Zeezrom and the chief judge Antionah. Alma uses stark imagery in his sermonizing at Ammonihah. He warns that for those who fail to repent and therefore experience "spiritual death", their "torments shall be as a lake of fire and brimstone, whose flame ascendeth up forever and ever".

Some residents of Ammonihah respond to Alma and Amulek's preaching by repenting and reading the scriptures. Others, however, are outraged, and these eventually seize the pair and imprison them. The plot escalates into a mass persecution as the Ammonihah majority drive male Christian converts out of the city, arrest their wives and children, and seize any scripture in their possession.

Martyrdoms 
After gathering Christian scriptures and prisoners, the people of Ammonihah create a fire in which they destroy scriptures and burn women and children alive as an intentional and distorted reference to Alma's sermon. The narrative states that any who believed Alma and Amulek's teachings or even listened to them at all become victims in Ammonihah. A chief judge brings Amulek and Alma to the "place of martyrdom" and forces them to watch, and he asks, "After what ye have seen, will ye preach again unto this people, that they shall be cast into a lake of fire and brimstone?" Kylie Nielson Turley explains, the judge "ensures that Alma understands the brutal irony at the heart of this horror. Alma's unfortunate gospel metaphor about a lake of fire and brimstone prompts the literal lake of fire and brimstone that burns before his eyes".

The people of Ammonihah keep Alma and Amulek imprisoned. The jailers take away their clothing, mock them, starve them, and even beat them. After days spent in this manner, Alma and Amulek finally escape through miraculous deliverance when the prison, in response to a prayer by Alma, spontaneously collapses without harming them. They leave Ammonihah and reunite with survivors in a place called Sidom. There, Alma and Amulek encounter an ailing Zeezrom, who has survived and repented, and Alma miraculously heals him. Amulek is no longer in possession of any of the wealth he had while living in Ammonihah, and he has implicitly lost his immediate family to the fires. The story closes with Alma taking Amulek into his home where he "did administer unto him in his tribulations".

Aftermath 
As the narrator of the book and the compiler in the framing narrative, Mormon follows up the Ammonihah story by describing its destruction amid the outbreak of unexpected Nephite–Lamanite war, casting the leveling of the city and its people as divine retribution for the violence committed in the narrative.

In the rest of the Book of Mormon, Ammonihah briefly reappears twice. The first time is in Alma 25, when Mormon recapitulates its destruction as part of an overlapping plot involving war and politics. The last appearance is in Alma 49, which mentions that the city of Ammonihah is rebuilt.

Intertextuality 
The martyrdoms at Ammonihah may parody the instructions for sacrifices given in Leviticus 16 (part of the Acharei Mot), in which God instructs Aaron and Moses to release one goat as "a scapegoat into the wilderness" and to take another as a "sin offering" to "burn in the fire". The men cast out from Ammonihah parallel the scapegoat while the women and children "serv[e] as a grotesque sin offering", G. St. John Stott explains.

Alma and Amulek's divinely-enabled escape from the Ammonihah prison resembles the New Testament's prison deliverance stories: the liberation of Peter in Acts 12 and that of Paul and Silas in Acts 16.

Interpretation 
Kylie Nielson Turley writes that the Ammonihah story is "one of the most disturbing episodes in the Book of Mormon" on account of its abruptly graphic violence and the twisted, personal motives behind that violence. Joseph Spencer calls the martyrdom "one of the grisliest scenes in the Book of Mormon". Charles Swift considers the story "one of the most poignant in all of scripture", observing that what starts as an uplifting story about Alma and Amulek becoming friends and colleagues "ends with the horrible death of innocent women and children and Amulek's having lost everything".

Suffering 
The narrative set in Ammonihah invites readers to ponder why a god capable of miracles seemingly allows suffering and evil to exist. In the story, God delivers Alma and Amulek from prison but does not stop women and children from being burned at Ammonihah. While watching the mass killing, Alma tells Amulek that God forbids him and Amulek from invoking a miracle to intervene, and Alma concludes that the deaths are willed by God so that he can receive them into heavenly paradise and visit just punishment on Ammonihah. In a commentary, Fatimah Salleh and Margaret Olsen Hemming consider this an unsatisfactory theology of suffering, stating that "Alma's response does not stand up to the scrutiny of the people's pain in front of him". Within the Book of Mormon's framing narrative, Alma's theological exposition may be read as a lapse on Alma's part, caused by shock from the carnage, or possibly as a case of Mormon as narrator-editor inserting an attempted explanation for inexplicable horror. Ultimately, the Ammonihah narrative, Salleh and Olsen Hemming explain, "does not necessarily answer the question" of suffering in a world with God and instead "it simply invites us to sit with it."

Fire imagery 
Ammonihah marks a turning point in the Book of Mormon's vocabulary. In the Book of Mormon before and during the Ammonihah arc, "lake of fire and brimstone" is a relatively common metaphor for hell and spiritual death. However, after Alma and Amulek escape Ammonihah, the phrase "lake of fire and brimstone" is never repeated for the remainder of the book. Within the context of the book's narrative, this may be a Nephite cultural response to the tragedy. In the context of the framing narrative, it might be part of Mormon's character as the internal editor-historian, responding to his own experience of reading the Ammonihah story.

Artistic depictions 
Artistic depictions of scenes of Ammonihah appear in George Reynolds's 1888 The Story of the Book of Mormon, a book containing what Noel Carmack calls "the first published attempt at illustrating the Book of Mormon". John Held Sr., father of cartoonist John Held Jr., created The Martyrdoms at Ammonihah and The Deliverance of Alma and Amulek (both pictured above) as woodblock prints. Carmack considers Martyrdoms the "strongest, most skillful piece" Held created for Story of the Book of Mormon, noting that its "complex, action-filled" scene is rare even in contemporary Book of Mormon art.

See also 

 Christian martyr
 Foxe's Book of Martyrs
 Outline of the Book of Mormon
 Problem of evil

References

Notes

General sources

Further reading

External links 

 Chapter 24 of The Story of the Book of Mormon which depicts Ammonihah in prose and with John Held Sr.'s accompanying prints, on the Internet Archive
 , the chapter of Ammonihah's first appearance in the Book of Mormon, on Wikisource 
Book of Mormon places